Desderius John Mipata (born 11 August 1960) is a Tanzanian CCM politician and Member of Parliament for Nkasi South constituency since 2010.

References

1960 births
Living people
Chama Cha Mapinduzi MPs
Tanzanian MPs 2010–2015
Kantalambwa Secondary School alumni